Madry may refer to:

 Madry, Missouri, an unincorporated community in Missouri, United States
 Mądry, a Polish surname

See also